Tina Eliassi-Rad is an American computer scientist and Professor in the Khoury College of Computer Sciences at Northeastern University. Her research considers the ethics of artificial intelligence and machine learning. She was elected Fellow of the Institute for Scientific Interchange in 2019.

Early life and education 
Eliassi-Rad studied computer sciences at the University of Wisconsin–Madison. She earned a bachelor's degree with distinction in 1993, before moving to Illinois to begin graduate program at the University of Illinois at Urbana–Champaign. She returned to Wisconsin for her doctoral research, where she worked on intelligent agents. After graduating, Eliassi-Rad joined the research team at the Lawrence Livermore National Laboratory.

Research and career 
Eliassi-Rad joined Rutgers University as an Assistant Professor in 2010. She moved to Northeastern University in 2016, where she was made Professor in 2020. She is part of the Northeastern University Network Science Institute. She currently teaches the honors inquiry course "Algorithms That Affect Lives."

Awards and honors 

 2010 United States Department of Energy Office of Science Outstanding Mentor Award
 2019 Elected Fellow of the Institute for Scientific Interchange

Selected publications

References

External links

American computer scientists
Northeastern University faculty
University of Wisconsin–Madison College of Letters and Science alumni
University of Illinois Urbana-Champaign alumni
Year of birth missing (living people)
Living people
American women computer scientists
American women academics
21st-century American women